

Arts at the Old Fire Station ('The OFS') is an arts centre in Oxford comprising a Theatre, Gallery and Shop. There are also studios available to hire for classes, rehearsals and meetings.

The organisation focuses on three key things:

 presenting new work across art forms
 supporting artists
 including people facing tough times.

The Old Fire Station building is shared between Arts at the OFS and Crisis Skylight Oxford. The Arts side put on great shows and exhibitions, and Crisis support people who are homeless with housing and employment advice. The two organisations work closely together. People experiencing homelessness help to run the arts centre as volunteers, artists, staff and trustees. By sharing the building and working together, the two charities have created a unique public space. Everyone who comes in - from coffee drinkers to comedy fans, and people sleeping rough to birthday card buyers - are coming through the same door and sharing the same space. And they're all in the right place.

History 
The building has experienced been many different things since it opened. Locals remember it as a nightclub, a science museum, and an arts centre back in the 1980s. Originally, it was a Victorian fire station and corn exchange. The sign for the corn exchange is still above the main doorway on George Street. The archway windows of the cafe were originally where the horse and cart fire service would enter and exit the building in emergencies.

Arts at the Old Fire Station was redeveloped in 2011 for use as both an arts centre and a Crisis Skylight Centre. Crisis Skylight Oxford is a training centre providing creative and formal learning opportunities to homeless and vulnerably housed people and a dedicated employment service which helps them find and keep jobs. The Crisis Skylight Cafe provides on-the-job training as well as food and drink to the wider public. In the evenings, this space becomes a Bar for Arts at the Old Fire Station, serving drinks for audiences attending shows.

References

External links

Brief history of the Old Fire Station building

Studio theatres in Oxford